"I'm a Mess" is a song recorded by American singer Bebe Rexha for her debut studio album, Expectations (2018). It was released as the first and only single from the album on June 15, 2018, following an early radio release in the United States. The song is produced by Jussifer and vocal produced by Devon Corey. According to Rexha, "The song is about accepting your own imperfections, and not dwelling on them but rather celebrating them".

Background and release
On September 18, 2017, a snippet of the track was shared by Rexha via an Instagram story. The second snippet was released on April 20, 2018. On June 7, 2018, Bebe announced through social media that her upcoming debut album's first single, entitled "I'm a Mess", would be released on June 15, 2018.

Composition
"I'm a Mess" contains an interpolation of the 1997 song "Bitch", performed by Meredith Brooks. It was written by Rexha alongside Justin Tranter and Jussifer, while the latter handled production with Devon Corey.

Music video
The music video was directed by Sophie Muller and premiered on July 19, 2018.

Live performances
Rexha performed the song on The Tonight Show Starring Jimmy Fallon, on the Teen Choice Awards, on the 2018 MTV Europe Music Awards. She also performed at the iHeartRadio Music Festival (along with "Meant to Be") and on Big Brother and America's Got Talent.

Track listing
Digital download
"I'm a Mess" - 3:15

Digital download – Acoustic
"I'm a Mess" (Acoustic) – 2:33

Digital download – Remixes
"I'm a Mess" (Ofenbach Remix) — 2:44
"I'm a Mess" (Robin Schulz Remix) – 3:20
"I'm a Mess" (Alphalove Remix) – 3:11

Charts

Weekly charts

Year-end charts

Certifications

Release history

References

2018 songs
2018 singles
Warner Records singles
Bebe Rexha songs
Songs written by Bebe Rexha
Songs written by Shelly Peiken
Songs written by Justin Tranter
Songs written by Meredith Brooks
Music videos directed by Sophie Muller
Songs written by Jussifer